Disulfur monoxide or sulfur suboxide is an inorganic compound with formula S2O, one of the lower sulfur oxides. It is a colourless gas and condenses to give a roughly dark red coloured solid that is unstable at room temperature.

 occurs rarely in natural atmospheres, but can be made by a variety of laboratory procedures.  For this reason, its spectroscopic signature is very well understood.

Structure and spectrum 
These bands have been assigned to decomposition products S3 and S4.

In the ultraviolet, S2O has absorption band systems in the ranges 250–340 nm and 190–240 nm. There are bands at 323.5 and 327.8 nm. The band in the 315–340 nm range is due to the  transition.

Gaseous disulfur monoxide does not absorb in the visible spectrum.

The microwave spectrum of S2O has the following rotational parameters: A = 41915.44 MHz, B = 5059.07 MHz, and C = 4507.19 MHz.  Moreover, the microwave spectrum suggests the S−S−O angle is 117.88° with S−S and S−O bond lengths of 188.4 and 146.5 pm, respectively.  In the 327.8 nm excited state, the central angle tightens to 109°. 

The harmonic frequency for S−S stretching is 415.2 cm−1.

Synthesis

Historical
Disulfur monoxide was discovered by Peter W. Schenk in 1933 with a glow discharge though sulfur vapour and sulfur dioxide. He discovered that the gas could survive for hours at single digit pressures of mercury in clean glass, but it decomposed near . Schenk assigned the formula as SO and called it sulfur monoxide.   In 1956, D. J. Meschi and R. J. Myers established the formula as S2O.

Preparation
Oxidizing sulfur with copper(II) oxide:
3 S8 + 12 CuO → 12 CuS +  4 S2O + 4 SO2
A relatively pure generator is the reaction of thionyl chloride with silver(I) sulfide:
SOCl2 + Ag2S → 2 AgCl + S2O

Also 5,6-di-tert-butyl-2,3,7-trithiabicyclo[2.2.1]hept-5-ene 2-endo-7-endo-dioxide decomposes upon heating with release of S2O:

Occurrence

Volcanism
It can form between 1% and 6% when hot 100-bar S2 and SO2 gas erupts from volcanoes. It is believed that Pele on Io is surrounded by solid S2O.

Terran atmosphere
Disulfur monoxide is too unstable to survive at standard conditions, but transient sources include incomplete combustion of sulfur vapor and thermal decomposition of sulfur dioxide in a glow discharge.

As a ligand 
Disulfur monoxide occurs as a ligand bound to transition metals, typically with hapticity 2. These complexes are closely related to transition metal sulfur dioxide complexes.

Reactions
On decomposition at room temperature it forms SO2 via the formation of polysulfur oxides:
2 S2O → "S3"  +  SO2
 reacts with diazoalkanes to form dithiirane 1-oxides.

Further reading
Possible biological occurrence: 
Cyclic disulfur monoxide: 
Discovery of S2O:

References

Gases
Sulfur oxides
Interchalcogens
Triatomic molecules